FreshXpress was a discount supermarket chain in the United Kingdom. It was originally formed in 2007, from the rump of the defunct Kwik Save chain, by Irish retail entrepreneur Brendan Murtagh. 

It existed in its original form between July 2007 and March 2008, culminating in it going into administration, and was then resurrected in a smaller form, however, during 2009, the resurrected company also went into administration, and has since ceased to exist.

History

From the remains of Kwik Save 
In February 2007, Brendan Murtagh and his son Alan Murtagh, major shareholders in the County Cavan-based Kingspan building materials group, backed 70% of a £50 million rescue plan for Kwik Save, with the Kwik Save managing director, Paul Niklas, covering the remaining 30%. 

Murtagh's son Alan Murtagh had already been a director of the business before he got involved.

A new beginning 
FreshXpress Retail Limited first had 56 stores, all of which were formerly Kwik Save stores before the chain went bankrupt. On 6 July 2007, 56 stores stayed open, forming FreshXpress in an £18m deal, saving around six hundred jobs. The FreshXpress stores officially opened on 21 July 2007.

Prodo and The Think Tank assisted with the creation of the new brand. In the middle of September 2007, due to poor trading results, this portfolio of stores was reduced from 56 to just 23 better performing stores, the closed stores were sold in chunks to Tesco, Sainsbury's, and The Co-op. Many of the stores were leased from the Somerfield group, and have since been leased to other retailers

Into administration 
Between September 2007 to March 2008, more under performing FreshXpress stores were closed down, leaving just nine stores, and Mr Niklas cut his ties with the company. In March 2008, FreshXpress went into administration. On 21 March, David Whitehouse, of Menzies Corporate Restructuring, was appointed joint administrator.

April 2008 
Another vehicle called FX Holdings (formerly Ivybrim), received the go ahead at Manchester Crown Court to acquire the remaining operating outlets. Andrew King, a former executive at Costcutter, one of the company's suppliers was to head up a nine store chain with 130 employees.

Into administration again 
The parent company of the second incarnation of FreshXpress, FX Holdings was placed into administration, and subject to a request for a winding up order in April 2009. All the remaining stores were closed.

References

External links 
FreshXpress official website (Web Archive)

Retail companies established in 2007
Defunct supermarkets of the United Kingdom
British companies established in 2007
Retail companies disestablished in 2009
Companies that have entered administration in the United Kingdom